The RPG-29 "Vampir" (Russian for "vampire") is a Soviet reusable rocket-propelled grenade (RPG) launcher. Adopted by the Soviet Army in 1989, it was the last RPG to be adopted by the Soviet military before the fall of the Soviet Union in 1991.

The RPG-29 has since been supplemented by other rocket-propelled systems, such as the RPG-30 and RPG-32. The RPG-29 has been used in combat with British Challenger 2 tanks in Iraq, and against Israeli Merkava tanks in Lebanon, which breached the tanks' armor and in some cases injured or killed crew members.

Description
The RPG-29 is a shoulder-fired, unguided, tube-style, breech-loading anti-tank rocket system with a range of 500 meters. The light weapon is designed to be carried and used by one soldier. Atop the launch tube is a 2.7× 1P38 optical sight.

When launched, the missile deploys eight fins as the rocket leaves the launcher, stabilizing the rocket during flight, up to a range of 500 meters.

Three warheads are available for the weapon:
 The TBG-29V thermobaric anti-personnel round.
 The OG-29 high-explosive/fragmentation (HE/FRAG) round for anti-personnel purposes.
 The PG-29V anti-tank/bunker round has a tandem-charge high-explosive anti-tank (HEAT) warhead to defeat explosive reactive armor (ERA). This warhead is standardized with that of the PG-7VR round fired by the RPG-7V rocket launcher. With a tandem-charge, an initial small charge detonates any reactive armor. If explosive reactive armor (ERA) or cage armor is absent, this charge strikes the main armor. Behind the primary charge, a much larger secondary shaped charge bursts at the rear of the initial warhead and projects a thin, high-speed-jet of metal into the armour compromised by the first charge. PG-29V can kill hard targets, including tanks with ERA.

The RPG-29 is unusual among Russian anti-tank rocket launchers in that it lacks an initial propellant charge to place the projectile at a safe distance from the operator before the rocket ignites. Instead, the rocket engine starts as soon as a trigger is pulled, and burns out before the projectile leaves the barrel.

On the bottom of the tube is a shoulder brace for proper positioning along with a pistol grip trigger mechanism. A side rail on its left side accepts a 1PN51-2 night sight.

History

The RPG-29 was developed during the late 1980s, following the development of the RPG-26, and entered service with the Soviet Army in 1989. It has recently seen intermittent use by irregular forces in the Middle East theater, including in combat against Allied forces during the Iraq War, and the 2006 Lebanon War, when it was used against Israeli forces.

2003 Iraq War
The RPG-29 is believed to have been used in skirmishes against American and British forces during the initial 2003 invasion of Iraq. An RPG-29 round was reported in August 2006 to have penetrated the frontal underside hull (equipped with ERA) of a Challenger 2 tank during an engagement in al-Amarah, Iraq, maiming one and wounding several other crew members, but only lightly damaging the tank, which drove home under its own power.

On August 25, 2007 a PG-29V hit a passing M1 Abrams in the hull rear wounding 3 crew members. On September 5, 2007, a PG-29V hit the side turret of an M1 Abrams in Baghdad, killing 2 of the crew and wounding 1, and the tank was seriously damaged.

In May 2008, The New York Times disclosed that another M1 Abrams tank had also been damaged by an RPG-29 in Iraq, while fighting Shia militias at Sadr City. The US Army ranks the RPG-29 threat to armor so high that they refused to allow the newly formed Iraqi army to buy it, fearing that it would fall into insurgent hands.

2006 Lebanon War
During the conflict, the Israeli newspaper Haaretz stated that the RPG-29 was a major source of Israel Defense Forces (IDF) casualties in the 2006 Lebanon War. A spokesman for the Russian Foreign Ministry denied that Russia had supplied arms directly to Hezbollah. Shortly before the end of the conflict the Russian  Kommersant magazine acknowledged through anonymous sources the possibility of a weapons transfer between Syria and Hezbollah during the Syrian withdrawal from Lebanon.

2011 Syrian Civil War 
During the Syrian Civil War, Syrian Opposition Forces and Islamic State (ISIL) both used RPG-29s.

Mexican Drug War
The cartels are known to have smuggled RPG-29s with some seized by Mexican forces.

2014 Gaza War
During the 2014 Gaza War, Hamas had used RPG-29s to attack IDF Merkava tanks, however because of the recently developed Trophy (countermeasure) they had little effect.

Iraqi Civil War
During the Iraqi Civil War, ISIL has used RPG-29s in Iraq, probably ones taken in Syria. And anti-ISIL Shia militias in Iraq have also used RPG-29s, the Iranian produced "Ghadir", which was supplied by Iran.

Operators

Current operators

State operators

 Iran - Locally produced as the "Ghadir"
 Mexico
 Russia
 Syria
 Pakistan

 Vietnam - Locally produced as the "SCT-29" (alternatively "SCT-105")
 North Korea

Non-state organizations
 Hezbollah
 Hamas
 Iraqi insurgents
  - At least one used during the Siege of Menagh Air Base
 Taliban militants (during 2013-2015)
  Syrian rebels

Former operators
 Soviet Union

See also
 M47 Dragon
 LRAC F1
 M79 Osa
 Rocket-propelled grenade (includes a description of tactics and history)

References

Bibliography

External links

 

Weapons of Russia
Anti-tank rockets
Modern anti-tank rockets of Russia
Rocket-propelled grenade launchers
Modern incendiary weapons of Russia
Rocket-propelled grenade launchers of the Soviet Union
Weapons and ammunition introduced in 1989
Bazalt products